Chongp'yŏng station is a railway station in Chŏngp'yŏng-ŭp, Chŏngp'yŏng county, South Hamgyŏng province, North Korea. It is located on the P'yŏngra Line of the Korean State Railway.

References

Railway stations in North Korea